Bridget Parker (born 5 January 1939) is an English equestrian and Olympic champion for Great Britain. She won a team gold medal in eventing at the 1972 Summer Olympics in Munich, and finished tenth in individual eventing. Parker rode a horse named Cornish Gold at the 1972 Olympic Games. The British team gold medal was later called one of the "30 greatest sporting achievements of all time" by Times magazine.

References

External links

1939 births
Living people
Olympic equestrians of Great Britain
British female equestrians
Equestrians at the 1972 Summer Olympics
English Olympic medallists
Olympic gold medallists for Great Britain
British event riders
Olympic medalists in equestrian
Medalists at the 1972 Summer Olympics